Iseo-myeon is a myeon, or township, in western Cheongdo County, Gyeongsangbuk-do, South Korea.  It borders Daegu on the north.  It is connected to both Daegu and central Cheongdo by Local Highway 30, which crosses under the Paljoryeong pass as it descends from Daegu to its terminus in Gangnam-myeon.  Iseo-myeon is composed of 17 ri.

The region has a long history of human habitation, and may have been the site of the Samhan era polity of Bukgobuguk.  However, it was not constituted as Iseo-myeon until the general reorganization of local government under the Japanese occupation in 1914.

The area is best known for the Cheongdo Bullfighting Festival, which is held annually on the banks of the Seowoncheon.  There are also four Joseon Dynasty institutions of education preserved in Iseo-myeon; these are the Heungseon Seowon (also called the Jagye Seowon), the Geumho Seowon, the Songgo Seodang and the Yonggang Seodang.  The seodang and seowon were both private academies, which focused principally on training children of the yangban class to pass the national civil service exam.  The Heungseon Seowon was erected in memory of Kim Il-son (김일손/金馹孫), who perished in the Muo purge of 1498.  The Geumho Seowon was erected in memory of Yi Un-ryong, who fought in the Seven Year War against Japan.

See also
Geography of South Korea
Subdivisions of South Korea

Notes

Cheongdo County
Towns and townships in North Gyeongsang Province